Jānis Streičs (born 26 September 1936) is a Latvian film director.
Streičs' 1991 comedy film The Child of Man was runner-up for the Chicago International Children's Film Festival Rights of the Child Award in 1994. It had previously been Latvia's submission for the Academy Award for Best Foreign Language Film at the 65th Academy Awards, but did not make the shortlist.

In 1978 Theater, in 1981 A Limousine the Colour of Midsummer's Eve and in 1991 The Child of Man received the Latvian Film Prize as the best film of the year.

References

1936 births
Living people
Latvian film directors
Lielais Kristaps Award winners
Soviet film directors
People from Preiļi Municipality